Éire Óg is a Gaelic football and hurling club based in Ovens, County Cork, Ireland. The club is affiliated with Cork GAA county board and the Muskerry divisional board.

History
Éire Óg Hurling and Football club (Cumann Iománaíochta agus Peile Éire Óg) is located in the parish of Ovens/Farran approximately 16 km west of Cork city, just off the main Cork-Killarney road.

Gaelic Games were played in the parish of Ovens and Farran dating back to the period immediately after the foundation of the G.A.A. in 1884. Éire Óg's predecessor, Bride Valley, named after the River Bride which flows through the parish, affiliated in 1890, fielding teams in both hurling and football.

Following the establishment of the Divisional Boards in the mid-1920s, Bride Valley won the first two Muskerry Junior Hurling Championship in 1925 & 1926 before the Éire Óg club was formed, with players from Cloughduv and two from Knockavilla joining forces with the Ovens and Farran based contingent in 1928.

The newly formed Éire Óg team entered the senior ranks in their inaugural campaign, winning the 1928 Senior Hurling Championship defeating Mallow in the final on a scoreline of 5–2 to 3–2.

Early successes in hurling were followed by a fallow period during the late 1930s and 1940s, when the club went into decline. Thanks to the efforts of men such as the late John Lyons, John Crean, Tom Murphy, Tim Lane, Jimmy O’Brien, Nicholas Irwin, Teddy O’Leary, Denny O’Sullivan and the Rev. Fr. Seán Murphy, Éire Óg survived the barren spell and began the journey to regain its former glories.

Underage success in 1953 sparked a revival of fortunes with a nucleus of players going on to win three divisional junior hurling titles in a row from 1960 to 1962, eventually winning the county outright in the latter year. Éire Óg won the Liam Breathnach Cup in 1964 before being re-graded to the junior ranks in 1969 where they won the Muskerry Junior Hurling title in 1971 and 1972.

Hurling dominated the landscape but Éire Óg did not manage to chalk-up their first Muskerry Junior Football Championship in 1976.

In 1977, Éire Óg won the Junior Hurling County Championship and returned to the Intermediate grade and it didn't take long for them to make an impression, winning the County Championship within two seasons in 1979 before going on to compete at senior level for the following three years.

In 1985 Éire Óg won their second Intermediate Hurling County title defeating Blackrock by 0–14 to 2–7. This would mark the end of a great era in the club's fortunes.

There was little in the way of adult success from the late 1980s to the early 2000s but this period did see a number of significant underage successes. Éire Óg secured Minor ‘B’ and ‘A’ Hurling County titles in 1988 and 1993.

Underage football emerged as a force during this period and significantly in 1998, the Under-14 footballers won the Cork Féile na nGael competition. Many of these players went on to win the club's first Minor ‘A’ Football County title four years later. In 2006 the minors landed a second county title and these successes provided the platform for Éire Óg's 2008 Junior Football County Championship win when they defeated Ballygarvan in the final.

Éire Óg also won the Premier 2 Minor Hurling County Championship that year an achievement that was matched in 2014, winning the Rebel Óg Minor ‘A’ Hurling County title.

In October 2014, Éire Óg won their first Intermediate Football Championship, defeating Rockchapel in the final on a scoreline of 0–14 to 0–6.

Having played at various sites throughout the parish since its foundation, Éire Óg settled in its current location in Knockanemore. The current pavilion and playing fields were opened in 1987 with later developments seeing the addition of two new playing fields west of Casey's Road and more recently, an all-weather astro-turf pitch, ball alley and new dressing-room facilities. The progress continues to the present day with works in-progress on the development of a floodlit, sand-and soil based pitch.

Inter-County representatives

All Ireland Senior Hurling Medal winners:

Dinny Barry Murphy, Joe O’Donovan, Colm Sheehan, Mick Malone.

All Ireland Senior Football Medal winners:

Daniel Goulding, Ciarán Sheehan.

Daniel and Ciarán's achievement of helping Cork to raise Sam Maguire in 2010 will live long in the memory. Both players were instrumental in securing Cork's seventh All-Ireland Senior Football Title with Daniel being named Man-of-the-Match.

Founder and first Éire Óg treasurer, Paddy O’Connell won an All-Ireland Senior Football medal with Cork in 1911 whilst playing with his then club, Nils. Barry Coffey, winner of two All-Ireland Senior Football medals in 1989 and 1990, representing his home club Bishopstown, also played with Éire Óg towards the end of his playing career.

Other Cork Medal winners:

The first player to play with Cork from Ovens parish was Michael Sheehan of Currahaly, 1890.

Other players to win medals playing with Cork were Billy Desmond who played with Bride Valley and later Éire Óg, John O’Sullivan, Jack Lucey, Mort Lucey, Jim O’Callaghan, Billy Murphy, Sam O’Callaghan, Tom Savage, Derry O’Brien, Finbarr Sheehan, Mattie Murphy, Denis Desmond, Paddy O’Brien, Jamsie O’Leary, Denis O’Brien, Michael Sheehan, Kevin Hallissey and John Dineen.

History (old version)

It is now certain that a parish team known as 'Bridevalley' played Inniscarra in the mid-Cork championship at Coachford on Sunday, 19 April 1891 – so there is a record of over 110 years of parish hurling. Probably the first parishioner to play for Cork was Willie Fitzgerald. He won a Dr. Croke Cup medal with Cork in 1902 and was the first chairman of the divisional board when it was formed in 1925. Club colours were then blue with red collars and cuffs.

In 1923, the Bridevalley was formed and remained active until 1927. In 1928, Bridevalley and Cloughduv amalgamated to form a senior club called Éire Óg and in that same year they won the Cork Senior Hurling Championship, defeating Mallow in the final at Cork Athletic Grounds before an attendance of 10,000 who paid a total of £332. Mallow had beaten Blackrock and Éire Óg beat St. Finbarr's en route to the final.

In 1936, Cloughduv and Bridevalley disbanded with the latter retaining the name Éire Óg and their club colours were red and blue.

Éire Óg achieved very little success during the 1940s but thanks to men like John Lyons, Tommy Murphy, John Crean, John Brady, Jimmy Brien, etc. the game was kept alive in Ovens.

The 1950s saw a great revival. Éire Óg juveniles won in 1952 and the minors won in 1953, and these wins were the nucleus for future success. Around this time, they changed to the current club colours – re and yellow. It is not generally known that the present colours were adopted purely by accident. The old jerseys began to disintegrate and funds were low. Fortunately Denis Desmond (Kilcrea) had a draper shop in Mallow. Some team in that area had ordered a set of jerseys but were slow to take them. Denis heard of the Éire Óg predicament and sold them the jerseys at half price. They were red and yellow.

The major breakthrough came in 1960 when Éire Óg won the Mid Cork junior hurling title and went on to retain it for the next two years. In 1962 the club won the Cork Junior Hurling Championship by defeating Carrigtwohill at the Athletic grounds by 3–4 to 2–4.

Éire Óg team was P O'Shea, T O'Sullivan, E. McCarthy, C. Lynch, C. Sheehan, B. O'Brien, F. Brady, J. O'Driscoll, F. Sheehan, D. O'Leary, D. O' Brien, T. Brady, M. Murphy, P. O'Brien and J McGovern.

The club went into the intermediate grade after that and won the intermediate league in 1963. However, they were beaten by a superb Glen Rovers side in the 1965 Cork Intermediate Hurling Championship final. They did win the Liam Breathnach cup in 1964, however.

in 1969 the club moved back to junior ranks and won the Mid Cork title in 1971 and 1972 as well as many minor and underage successes. Another Mid Cork title came to the Ovens area in 1977, and the same year they won the Cork Junior Hurling Championship when they defeated Erin's Own by 2–8 to 1–9 at Páirc Uí Chaoimh.

The 1977 county champions from Éire Óg were D. O'Brien, T. Brennan, J. Murphy, L. O' Leary, L. O'Flynn, J. Dineen, J. O'Flynn, D. Desmond, D. O'Flynn, C. Sheehan, M. O'Flynn, C, Malone, D. O'Flynn, M. Malone, J. O'Leary. Sub – B. Murphy.

In 1978, Éire Óg won the Muskerry cup in its first year.

Success in the Cork Intermediate Hurling Championship soon followed in 1979 when Éire Óg defeated Mallow 7–11 to 5–8 in the final in Páirc Uí Chaoimh in front of 8,000 people. Éire Óg team was D. O'Brien, T. Brennan, J. Murphy, L. O'Leary, L. O'Flynn, J. Dineen, J. O'Flynn, J. O'Leary, D. Desmond, M. O'Flynn, V. Twomey, Dan O'Flynn, C. Malone, M. Malone and M. Kelleher. After a lapse of 51 years Éire Óg were back in senior ranks.

In 1980, the senior championship was run on a league basis. Éire Óg played Na Piarsaigh, Nemo Rangers, UCC and Bandon to win this section. Éire Óg faced St. Finbarr's in the quarter final and were beaten on a score of 2–10 to 1–11 and according to a Cork Examiner report, "Éire Og responded with admiration to the marvellous attempt to sweep St. Finbarr's out of the reckoning and had the city side back-pedalling for lengthy periods, and a semi-final place eluded them only because of a failure to offer an adequate deterrent to the presence of Jimmy Barry-Murphy at full forward. Jimmy scored two vital goals".

In 1981 Éire Og, the only club representing Mid-Cork in senior hurling, won a great first round match against Avondhu, but were later narrowly beaten by Youghal. However, their second string won the B hurling championship. Éire Óg were due to play Ballincollig in the final of the Muskerry Cup, but due to pressure of matches, this game was not played.

1982 saw Éire Óg being beaten by the narrowest of margins by Carrigdhoun in the first round of the championship. However they won the Mid Cork under 12 hurling championship for the first time and also won the Under-16B football championship.

In 1983 Éire Óg decided to seek regrading to Intermediate ranks, but here again could be considered unlucky to have been defeated by Ballinhassig by 1 point in the semi-final of the championship. Neutral observers would have considered that a draw would have been a fairer result. In 1984, Éire Óg lost to Bandon in the first round of the Cork Intermediate Hurling Championship and also lost to Blarney in the junior championship.

However, in 1985, in true Éire Óg spirit, they came back on top form again winning both the Cork Intermediate Hurling Championship by beating Blackrock in a fantastic display of hurling in Riverstown and also the Intermediate League by beating Inniscarra after a replay.

Éire Óg hurlers who have won an All Ireland medal with their county include Jimmy Barry Murphy, Colm Sheehan (Senior 1966), Mick Malone (Senior 1976, 1977 and the only player to hold four All Ireland U21 hurling medals), Mattie Murphy, Finbarr Sheehan, and Derry O' Brien (Intermediate 1966).

Éire Óg has traditionally been mainly associated with hurling but in recent years football has made huge progress in the club.

In 1961, Éire Óg made their first breakthrough in football, winning the Mid-Cork Junior B title. They regained the title again in 1968 when they Blarney in the final which was played in Coachford. In 1972, they beat Ballyvourney in the Junior A semi-final, but lost to Ballincollig in the final on a scoreline of 1–7 to 2–3.

In 1973, Éire Óg were defeated by Ballyvourney, who won the junior county title that year. In the same year, Éire Óg won their first junior football league. Interest in football was now serious.

On a wet cold day in 1976, Éire Óg football had its greatest moment when their greater experience was one of the deciding factors in helping them to win their first ever Mid-Cork Junior A title, on a scoreline of 1–13 to Donoughmore's 2–1. Team: C. Malone, T. Brennan, J. Murphy, B. Webster, J. O'Flynn, D. Murphy, J. Dineen, .McSweeney, D. O'Brien, D' O'Flynn, S. O'Callaghan, M. Kelleher, J. O'Sullivan, M. Malone, J. O' Leary. Sub – D. Desmond for M. Kelleher.

Cloyne put a stop the Éire Óg's county title aspirations defeating them in a game played in the park by 1–9 to 2–4.

Hurling seemed to dominate in 1977, but Éire Óg reached the Junior A final in 1983 where Donoughmore gained revenge for their defeat in 1976.

A keen interest in football at underage level developed in Éire Óg in the early '80s. In 1982, '83 and '84 they reached the U21 mid-Cork finals.

In 2008, the club won the Cork Junior Football Championship title. In addition, Daniel Goulding and Ciarán Sheehan became members of the Cork Senior football squad.

Honours
 Cork Senior Hurling Championship Winners (1) 1928 Runners-up 1931 (both with Cloughduv)
 Cork Intermediate Hurling Championship Winners (2) 1979, 1985 Runners-up 1937, 1965, 2013, 2017 
 Cork Senior A Football Championship Winners (1) 2020
 Cork Premier Intermediate Football Championship Winners (1) 2019
 Cork Intermediate Football Championship Winners (1) 2014 Runners-up 2012
 Cork Junior Hurling Championship Winners (2) 1962, 1977
 Cork Junior Football Championship Winners (1) 2008
 Cork Minor A Hurling Championship Winners (2) 1993, 2008, 2014
 Cork Minor A Football Championship Winners (2) 2002, 2006
 Cork Under-21 Hurling Championship Runners-up 1973
 Mid Cork Junior A Hurling Championship Winners (7) 1930, 1960, 1961, 1962, 1971, 1972, 1977 Runners-up 1928, 1932, 1941, 1950, 1958, 1973, 1974
 Mid Cork Junior A Football Championship Winners (2) 1976, 2008 Runners-up 1972, 1973, 1983
 Cork Minor Premier 1 Football Championship Winners 2017

Notable players
 Denis Desmond
 John Dineen
 Mary Geaney
 Daniel Goulding
 Mick Malone
 Ciarán Sheehan
 Colm Sheehan (Cork Senior All Ireland 1966)
 Liam Miller (Irish soccer international)

References

External links
 Official Éire Óg Club website

Gaelic games clubs in County Cork
Gaelic football clubs in County Cork
Hurling clubs in County Cork